Pelagerythrobacter marensis is a Gram-negative bacterium from the genus Pelagerythrobacter which has been isolated from seawater near the Mara Island on Korea.

References

External links
Type strain of Altererythrobacter marensis at BacDive -  the Bacterial Diversity Metadatabase	

Sphingomonadales
Bacteria described in 2010